Mondli Makhanya is the newly appointed Editor-In-Chief of the City Press. He was formerly the Editor-in-Chief of The Sunday Times (South Africa) newspaper. He also sits on the council of the South African National Editors' Forum.

As an outspoken critic of the South African government's recent controversial arms deal and the alleged irregularities contained within, he regularly used his columns to express this.

Avusa Media Newspapers 
It was made public on 25 March 2010 that Makhanya was appointed editor-in-chief of Avusa Media Newspapers.

Journalistic career

References 

Living people
South African journalists
Year of birth missing (living people)